Kaznatash (Qaźnataş) is a rural locality (a village) in Novosubayevsky Selsoviet, Nurimanovsky District, Bashkortostan, Russia. The population was 13 as of 2010. There is 1 street.

Geography 
Kaznatash is located 27 km east of Krasnaya Gorka (the district's administrative centre) by road. Novy Subay is the nearest rural locality.

References 

Rural localities in Nurimanovsky District